The 2007 European Mountain Running Championships were held on 14 July in Cauterets, France. Held by the European Athletic Association.

The championships comprised four races, incorporating junior races for the first time: the men's race, which was 12.8 km long with a 1,570 m ascent, the women's and under-20s men's competitions over 8.5 km and containing a 1,010 m ascent, and finally the under-20s women's race which was competed over 4 km with a rise of 400 m.

Ahmet Arslan of Turkey won the title in the men's senior race while the Norwegian Anita Evertsen took the gold medal in the women's race. Italy reached to the senior men's team gold medal and Switzerland won the women's team gold. The junior men's competition was largely a Turkish affair, with Mehmet Akkoyun winning gold and leading a 1-2-3 for his country. The women's junior race was won by Lucija Krkoc from Slovenia. United Kingdom took the team gold.

Results

Men's senior race

Total participants: 67 runners finished and 17 teams.

Women's senior race

Total participants: 65 runners finished and 16 teams.

Men's under-20s race

Total participants: 36 runners finished and 9 teams.

Women's under-20s race

Total participants: 20 runners finished and 6 teams.

References

External links
Results at European Athletics

European Mountain Running Championships
European Mountain Running Championships, 2007
European Mountain Running Championships, 2007
European Mountain Running Championships
International athletics competitions hosted by France